The Daily Press (also , , and ) was an English-language newspaper in Hong Kong, published from 1857 for about 80 years. Founded and edited by George M Ryder, it was the first daily newspaper in Hong Kong. In 1858, Yorick Jones Murrow, a tenacious Welshman born in 1817, took over the newspaper and he inaugurated the Chinese-language paper Hongkong Chinese and Foreign News (香港中外新報), published three times per week.Murrow led the paper on fearless attacks on the Colonial administration, leading ultimately to his imprisonment on a charge of libel. He relinquished his role as editor in 1867 but remained its proprietor till his death in 1884.

It operated in a building at the junction of Wyndham Street and Glenealy, Central District, for some years, but had left no later than 1911, when the building was converted to the Wyndham Hotel.

See also
 List of newspapers in Hong Kong

References

External links
 Online archive of editions up to September 1941 maintained by the Hong Kong Public Libraries

Defunct newspapers published in Hong Kong
English-language newspapers published in Hong Kong
Publications established in 1857
1857 establishments in the British Empire